The 6th Engineers Regiment is a regiment of the génie militaire of the French Military constituted under the IIIrd Republic. It is the only Engineers Regiment among the  Troupes de Marine (French Marine Corps).

Creation and different nominations 

In 1894 : 6th Engineer Regiment 6e RG was created, on October 1 at Angers. The regiment was installed in garrison Eblé designated after the général whose men perished while constructing the bridges on the Bérézina.

History

1894 to 1914 

 1894 : Angers
 1895 : Campaigns in Madagascar 
 1900 : China

World War I 

 1914 : La Marne
 1916 : Verdun
 1917 : L'Aisne
 1918 : Champagne

During the campaign of 1914-1918, 17 companies of the regiment were cited 72 times (out of which 47 citations at the orders of the armed forces). 15 companies of the regiment were awarded the right to wear the fourragere of the Croix de guerre 1914-1918.

Interwar period 

 1918-1939 :  Angers
 1925-1927: Rif War

World War II 

In June 1940, the 6th Engineer Regiment participated to the combats of the Cadets of Saumur. Missioned by lieutenant-colonel Robert, regimental commander of the depot of the 6th Engineer Regiment, lieutenant Rousseau was the chief head center at Saumur and had at his disposition, for each bridge, one officer with some 30 men : lieutenant Martin on the bridge of Montsoreau, lieutenant Poupon on the bridge of VR de Saumur, sous-lieutenant Fraisier on the bridge of VF de Saumur, sous-lieutenant Falck on the bridge of Gennes.

In total, there were 120 men at the war depot of the 6th Engineer Regiment which supported the combats of the Cadets of Saumur.

Captain Schneider was cited for the defensive mounted on the bridge of Port-Boulet.

At mobilization on September 1939, the 71st Engineer Battalion was created at Angers. The active encadrement of this unique regiment of engineer of the 1st Colonial Infantry Division 1re DIC was issued from the 6th Engineer Regiment.

From that came the links between the 71st and 6th, out of which in 1997, was summarized by the transfer to the 6e RG of a complete consecutive company at the dissolution of the 71st.

1945 to present 

Following World War II, the 6th was garrisoned in Angers at garrison Vernau, in designation of Jean-Edouard Verneau, a resistant French général, deceased in deportation in 1944. 
 1946 -  : garrison at Angers. 
 1945 - 1954 : participated to the French Far East Expeditionary Corps.
 1977 - 1984 : 4th Cavalry Division.
 1984 - 1993 : 3rd Army Corps.
 1993 -  : 9th Marine Infantry Division 9e DIMa, then 9th Light Armoured Marine Brigade 9e BLBMa, then designated 9th Marine Infantry Brigade 9e BIMa.
 Interventions in Lebanon, Guyana, Central African Republic, Tchad, Pakistan, Kuwait, Somalia, Rwanda, Cambodia, Congo, Albenia, Kosovo and Bosnia and Herzegovina.
 Since 2004, 500 sapeurs of the 6th Engineer Regiment deployed to the Ivory Coast, Guyana, Afghanistan, Senegal, Martinique, Mayotte and Haiti.
 In February 2006, a hundred sapeurs were deployed to aid the populations of the Reunion in an epidemic. 
 In 2010 : the "6" integrated two companies in the 2nd Engineer Regiment 2e RG and one reserve company 22nd Marine Infantry Battalion 22e BIMa.
 In 2013 : the "6" was engaged in Mali during Operation Serval.

Traditions

Motto 

To recall the commitment, fidelity and hardship work of the sapeurs of the "6", the writer Hervé Bazin, nominated the motto of the regiment "Je continuerai". In the years of 1980, the motto was  "Parfois détruire, souvent construire, toujours servir".

Nickname 
The Marine soldiers are called "marsouins" when coming from the infantry or light cavalry and "bigors" when coming from the artillery. The engineers being more recently added in the French Marines, they do not have a traditional nickname. They are called "sapeurs de Marine" (Marine engineers).

Regimental Colors

Decorations
The regimental colors of the 6th Engineer Regiment 6e RG is decorated with:

 15 companies of the 6th Engineer Regiment, were cited numerous times for collective and individual acts of valor during the 1914-1918 world conflict and two citations at the orders of the armed forces. 
Croix de guerre 1914-1918 with:
 2 palms
Croix de la Valeur militaire with:
 1 palm (May 4, 2013)

Fourragere:

Fourragère with colors of the croix de guerre 1914-1918

Honours

Battle Honours 

Madagascar 1895
La Marne 1914
Verdun 1916
L'Aisne 1917
Champagne 1918

Regimental Commander

External links
website (in French)

French engineer regiments
Military units and formations established in 1894